Frank Hurt Secondary School is a public high school in Surrey, British Columbia, Canada. It is part of the provincial School District 36 Surrey. Frank Hurt has five feeder schools, which are Bear Creek Elementary, M.B. Sanford Elementary, Georges Vanier Elementary, Chimney Hills Elementary, Lund elementary. and T.E. Scott Elementary

Gallery

References

High schools in Surrey, British Columbia
Educational institutions in Canada with year of establishment missing